In New Zealand, the speaker of the House of Representatives, commonly known as the speaker of the House, is the presiding officer and highest authority of the New Zealand House of Representatives. The individual who holds the position is elected by members of the House from among their number in the first session after each general election. They hold one of the highest-ranking offices in New Zealand. The current Speaker is Adrian Rurawhe who was elected on 24 August 2022.

The speaker's role in presiding over New Zealand's House of Representatives is similar to that of speakers elsewhere in other countries that use the Westminster system. The speaker presides over the House's debates, determining which members may speak; the speaker is also responsible for maintaining order during debate, and may discipline members who break the rules of the House. Aside from duties relating to presiding over the House, the speaker also performs administrative and procedural functions, and remains a Member of Parliament (MP).

Role

In the debating chamber

The speaker's most visible role is that of presiding over the House of Representatives when it is in session. The speaker presides from an elevated chair behind the Table in the debating chamber. This involves overseeing the order in which business is conducted, and determining who should speak at what time. The speaker is also responsible for granting or declining requests for certain events, such as a snap debate on a particular issue.

An important part of the speaker's role is enforcing discipline in the House. They are expected to conduct the business of the House in an impartial manner. The speaker defers to 'Standing Orders', which are the written rules of conduct governing the business of the House. Included in these rules are certain powers available to the speaker to ensure reasonable behaviour by MPs, including the ability to order disruptive MPs to leave the debating chamber. MPs who feel one of these rules has been breached by another member can interrupt a debate by using a procedure known as a 'point of order'. The speaker must then determine whether the complaint is just. Earlier Speaker's rulings on similar points of order are referred to in considering the point raised. The clerk of the House, who sits directly in front of the speaker, assists the speaker in making such rulings.

By convention, speakers have traditionally been addressed inside the debating chamber as "Mr Speaker" or "Madam Speaker".

Outside the debating chamber
The speaker is also responsible for directing and overseeing the administration and security of the buildings and grounds of Parliament (including the Beehive, Parliament House, Bowen House and the Parliamentary Library building), and the general provision of services to members. In doing so, the speaker consults and receives advice from the Parliamentary Service Commission, which comprises MPs from across the House.

As the most senior office of Parliament, the speaker has other statutory responsibilities, for example under the Electoral Act 1993. In this role a portion of the Parliament Buildings are given over to the speaker. Known as the Speaker's Apartments these include his personal office, sitting rooms for visiting dignitaries and a small residential flat which the speaker may or may not use as living quarters.

The speaker chairs three select committees:
the Standing Orders Committee
the Business Committee
the Officers of Parliament Committee.

The Business Committee chaired by the speaker controls the organisation of the business of the House. Also on the committee, established after the first mixed member proportional (MMP) election in 1996, is the leader of the House, the Opposition shadow leader and the whips of each party.

Neutrality
The speaker is expected to conduct the functions of the office in a neutral manner, even though the speaker is generally a member of the governing party. Only three people have held the office despite not being from the governing party. In 1923, Charles Statham (an independent, but formerly a member of the Reform Party) was backed by Reform so as not to endanger the party's slim majority, and later retained his position under the United Party. In 1993, Peter Tapsell (a member of the Labour Party) was backed by the National Party for the same reason. Bill Barnard, who had been elected Speaker in 1936, resigned from the Labour Party in 1940 but retained his position.

Historically, a speaker lost the right to cast a vote, except when both sides were equally balanced. The speaker's lack of a vote created problems for a governing party – when the party's majority was small, the loss of the speaker's vote could be problematic. Since the shift to MMP in 1996, however, the speaker has been counted for the purposes of casting party votes, to reflect the proportionality of the party's vote in the general election. The practice has also been for the speaker to participate in personal votes, usually by proxy. In the event of a tied vote the motion in question lapses.

Election
The speaker is always a member of Parliament (MP), and is elected to the position by other MPs at the beginning of a parliamentary term, or when a speaker dies, resigns or is removed from the position (via a vote of no confidence) intra-term. The election of a speaker is presided over by the clerk of the House. It is unusual for an election to be contested, with only six votes since 1854 having more than one candidate. The first such contested vote did not occur for 69 years until 1923. It took 73 years for the second contested vote for Speaker in 1996. If there are two candidates, members vote in the lobbies for their preferred candidate. In the case of three or more candidates, a roll-call vote is conducted and the candidate with the fewest votes eliminated, with the process continuing (or reverting to a two-way run-off) until one candidate has a majority. Members may vote only if they are present in person: no proxy votes are permitted.

It is traditional for the newly-elected speaker to pretend he or she did not want to accept the position; the speaker feigns resistance as they are 'dragged' to their chair, in a practice dating from the days when British speakers risked execution if the news they reported to the king was displeasing.

After being elected by the House, the speaker-elect is formally confirmed in office by the governor-general. At the start of a term of Parliament, the newly confirmed speaker follows the tradition of claiming the privileges of the House.

Precedence, salary and privileges

Each day, prior to the sitting of the House of Representatives, the speaker and other officials travel in procession from the speaker's personal apartments to the debating chamber. The procession includes the doorkeeper, the serjeant-at-arms, the speaker and the speaker's assistant. When the speaker reaches the chamber, the serjeant-at-arms announces the Speaker's arrival and places the Mace on the Table of the House.

, the annual salary is NZ$268,500.

The office is third most important constitutionally, after the governor-general and the prime minister. (See New Zealand order of precedence.)

Official dress
Originally, speakers wore a gown and formal wig in the chamber. This practice has fallen into disuse since the 1990s. Speakers now generally wear what they feel appropriate, usually an academic gown of their highest held degree or a Māori cloak.

Holders of the office
The current Speaker is Adrian Rurawhe, a member of the Labour Party.

Since the creation of Parliament, 31 people have held the office of speaker. Two people have held the office on more than one occasion. A full list of speakers is below.

Key
† indicates Speaker died in office.

Deputies
There are currently four presiding officers (usually three) appointed to deputise for the Speaker:

 Deputy Speaker: Greg O'Connor
 First Assistant Speaker: Hon Jenny Salesa
 Second Assistant Speaker: Hon Jacqui Dean
 Third Assistant Speaker: Ian McKelvie

Between 1854 and 1992, the Chairman of Committees chaired the House when in Committee of the whole House (i.e., taking a bill's committee stage) and presided in the absence of the Speaker or when the Speaker so requested. These arrangements were based on those of the House of Commons of the United Kingdom. Until 1992, the Chairman of Committees was known as the Deputy Speaker only when presiding over the House. That year, the position of Deputy Speaker was made official, and the role of Chairman of Committees was discontinued. The first Deputy Speaker was appointed on 10 November 1992. Additionally, two Assistant Speakers are usually appointed. The first Assistant Speaker was appointed in 1996, replacing the position of Deputy Chairman of Committees, which had been established in 1975. The Deputy Speaker and Assistant Speakers take the chair and may exercise the Speaker's authority in his or her absence. On 1 March 2022, Ian McKelvie was appointed as a third Assistant Speaker, in order to ensure that a presiding officer would be always be available while the House was sitting with some members participating remotely during the COVID-19 pandemic. Two further temporary Assistant Speakers were added for the sitting week of 9 to 11 August 2022, to cover absences. On 22 November 2022, when the government accorded urgency to business as a result of the sitting time lost from the passing of Elizabeth II, Barbara Kuriger was appointed as a temporary Assistant Speaker until 26 November 2022.

Key

See also
Speaker of the New Zealand Legislative Council
Constitution of New Zealand

Footnotes

Notes

References

External links

Office of the Speaker – New Zealand House of Representatives (Official)
NZ Speakers of the House of Representatives, ©1986 Air New Zealand Almanac

Constitution of New Zealand
New Zealand, House of Representatives, Speaker

Speaker